Simon Grix (born 28 September 1985) is an Ireland international rugby league footballer who played as a  forward for Halifax in the Betfred Championship and has been the team's manager since May 2019.

Background
Grix was born in Halifax, West Yorkshire, England.

Playing career

Halifax
Grix began his career at Halifax spending the 2003 and 2004 seasons at the club.

Warrington Wolves
In 2006 he joined the Warrington Wolves in the Super League.

He missed out on selection through injury for three Challenge Cup Finals.

He played in the 2012 Super League Grand Final defeat to the Leeds Rhinos at Old Trafford.

He played in the 2013 Super League Grand Final defeat to the Wigan Warriors at Old Trafford.

Halifax Panthers
After 10 years at the Halliwell Jones Stadium he returned to Halifax.

International career
He was mooted for a call-up to the Ireland squad for the 2008 Rugby League World Cup, and was named in the Ireland training squad but did not make the final side.

He eventually made his Ireland début in 2010.

He was named in their squad for the 2013 Rugby League World Cup but was ruled out by injury prior to the tournament and was replaced by Matty Hadden.

Coaching career
On 22 May 2019, it was announced that Grix would become the head coach of Halifax Panthers in the RFL Championship following a successful stint as interim.
In the 2021 Championship season, Grix guided Halifax to a third placed finish which qualified them for the playoffs.  After defeating Whitehaven in the first week, Halifax travelled to Featherstone with the winner to play Toulouse Olympique in the Million Pound Game.  Halifax would lose the match 42-10 which ended their season.

Personal life
He is the younger brother of the rugby league footballer; Scott Grix, and cousin of the association footballer and manager; Michael Collins.

References

External links
Profile at halifaxrlfc.co.uk
Simon Grix: Warrington Wolves back to join coaching staff
Profile at warringtonwolves.com

1985 births
Living people
English people of Irish descent
English rugby league players
Halifax R.L.F.C. coaches
Halifax R.L.F.C. players
Ireland national rugby league team players
Rugby league players from Halifax, West Yorkshire
Rugby league second-rows
Warrington Wolves players